An owl is a bird of prey.

Owl, Owls, or OWL may also refer to:

Arts and entertainment

Fictional entities

 Owl (comics), the name of several comics characters
 Owl (Winnie the Pooh)
 Ordinary Wizarding Level, a test of magical aptitude in the Harry Potter novel series

Film and television
 Owl (film), a 2003 Japanese black comedy
 The Owl (1927 film), a German silent film
 The Owl (1991 film), an American television film
 The Owl (TV series), a French series of animated shorts for children
 OWL/TV, a Canadian children's educational television series 1985–1994
 "Owls" (Millennium), a television episode

Literature
 "The Owl" (fairy tale), a German fairy tale collected by the Brothers Grimm
 OWL (magazine), a Canadian children's educational magazine; basis of the OWL/TV series
 The Owl (magazine): A Wednesday Journal of Politics and Society, a satirical society newspaper published in London 1864–1870

Music
 Owl (band), a Los Angeles-based hard-rock band, and the title of their 2009 album
 Owls (band), a Chicago-based rock band
 Owls (album), 2001
 Of Wondrous Legends, or O.W.L., an American psych folk band, and the title of their 1971 album
 The Owl (album), by the Zac Brown Band, 2019
 Owl, an album by Qwel & Maker, 2010

Other uses in arts and entertainment
 Owl (sculpture), a public statue in Canberra, Australia
 NASPA Word List, or OWL, the official word list for Scrabble in North America

Businesses and organizations
 Office Workstations Limited, a British software company
 Older Women's League, an American organization
 Order of Owls, an American fraternal order
 Owl Labs, a company that builds remote conferencing devices
 The Owl Drug Company, an American drug retailer

Languages
 Owl (hieroglyph), an Egyptian language uniliteral
 Old Welsh, ISO 639 language code owl

Military
 HMS Owl, the name of a British ship and a shore establishment
 USS Owl, the name of two American ships
 CSS Owl, a Confederate States Navy blockade runner in the American Civil War
 Curtiss O-52 Owl, an American observation aircraft before and during World War II

People
 Owl Chapman, a short-board surfer
 Owl Fisher (born 1991), an Icelandic journalist
 Owl Goingback (born 1959), American author

Places
 Owl Creek (disambiguation)
 Owl Mountains, Poland
 Owl Peak, Wyoming, U.S.
 Owl River (disambiguation)
 Olympic–Wallowa Lineament (OWL), a physiographic feature in Washington State, U.S.
 Ostwestfalen-Lippe (OWL), an area in North Rhine-Westphalia, Germany

Science and technology

Astronomy
 NGC 457, an open star cluster also known as the Owl Cluster
 Owl Nebula, in the constellation Ursa Major
 Overwhelmingly Large Telescope, a proposed optical telescope

Computing 
 Object Windows Library, a C++ object-oriented application framework
 Online Watch Link, a commercial web application for Neighbourhood Watch schemes
 Openwall Project (Owl), a security-enhanced Linux distribution
 Owl (AOL), a user-generated content site created by AOL in 2010
 Owl Scientific Computing, a software system for scientific and engineering computing
 Web Ontology Language, a family of knowledge representation languages

Sports
 Bielawa Owls, an American football team based in Bielawa, Poland
 Chicago Owls, a defunct professional American football team based in Chicago
 Clinton Owls, a defunct minor league baseball team, based in Clinton, Iowa (1937–1938)
 Dayton Owls, a minor league ice hockey team in the International Hockey League for the 1977–1978 season
 Florida Atlantic Owls, the athletics teams of Florida Atlantic University
 Forest City Owls, a baseball team in the Coastal Plain League, a collegiate summer league
 Grand Rapids Owls, a defunct International Hockey League team
 Owls, the athletic teams of Keene State College
 Kennesaw State Owls, the athletic teams of Kennesaw State University
 Owls, the athletic teams of the University of Maine at Presque Isle
 Orem Owlz, a minor league baseball team
 Rice Owls, the athletic teams of Rice University
 Temple Owls, the athletic teams of Temple University
 Topeka Owls, a defunct Western Association minor league baseball team based in Topeka, Kansas
 Uni-Norths Owls, an Australian rugby union club
 Owls, the athletic teams of Westfield State University
 Sheffield Wednesday F.C., an English football club nicknamed "The Owls"
 OWLS AC Leicester, an English athletics club
 Guildford Owls, an Australian rugby league club
 Overwatch League, a professional esports league

Transportation
 OWLS, a mnemonic used by general aviation airplane pilots
 Owl service, or public transport night service
 Night Owl (train), between Boston and Washington, D.C.
 Owl a train on the Delaware, Lackawanna and Western Railroad and later Erie Lackawanna Railway
 Owl a train of the Southern Pacific Transportation Company

Other uses
 Owl butterfly, a member of the genus Caligo
 Olympic–Wallowa Lineament, a geological feature in the state of Washington
 Online Writing Lab, an extension of a university writing center
 Our Whole Lives, a comprehensive sexuality curriculum from the Unitarian Universalist Association and the United Church of Christ

See also

 Owl Club (disambiguation)
 Night owl (person), a nocturnal person
 OWLeS, the Ontario Winter Lake-effect Systems study project